Bruno Siegfried Huhn (1 August 1871 – 13 May 1950) was a British composer, pianist, organist and musical director.  Born in London on 1 August 1871, he studied piano under Sophie Taunton, later toured in Spain, Italy, Egypt, India and Australia before moving to New York City in 1891.  His works include:

 Te Deum Laudamus for soloists, chorus, orchestra and organ;
 Jubilate Deo for soloists, chorus, orchestra and organ; and
 Various settings of poems for voice and piano, including "Eldorado" and "Israfel" by Edgar Allan Poe, "The Unknown" by Walt Whitman, and  "Invictus" by W.E. Henley.
Invictus, song

References

Baker, Theodore, Baker's Biographical Dictionary of Musicians, Third Revised Edition, revised and enlarged by Alfred Remy, M.E., G. Schirmer 1919.
The Lied and Art Songs Texts Page, http://www.lieder.net/lieder/

External links
 

British composers
British classical pianists
Male classical pianists
British classical organists
British male organists
1871 births
1950 deaths
Male classical organists